Bebearia schoutedeni is a butterfly in the family Nymphalidae. It is found in the Democratic Republic of the Congo (Shaba) and Zambia.

References

Butterflies described in 1954
schoutedeni